Bouchoux Hill is a mountain located in the Catskill Mountains of New York southeast of Hancock. Rattlesnake Hill is located northeast, Big Fork Mountain is located northeast, and Taylor Hill is located east-southeast of Bouchoux Hill.

References

Mountains of Delaware County, New York
Mountains of New York (state)